Edappally (Station code:IPL) is a railway station of the Southern Railway Network in Edappally, Kochi, India. This station handles mainly passenger trains in Shoranur – Cochin Harbour section and a few express trains. The railway station is located about 6 km from Ernakulam Town, 9 km from Ernakulam Junction and 11 km from Aluva  Railway Stations. Rail connectivity to the ICTT Vallarpadom Terminal starts from Edappally with route length of 8.86 km.

Express trains

 Chennai - Alleppey Alleppey Express No:6041/6042
Tea Garden Express No:6865/6866
Amritha Express No:6343/6344

See also
 Ernakulam Junction
 Ernakulam Town
 Aluva

References

Thiruvananthapuram railway division
Railway stations in Kochi
Railway stations in Ernakulam district